The Tunguska event (occasionally also called the Tunguska incident) was an approximately 12-megaton explosion that occurred near the Podkamennaya Tunguska River in Yeniseysk Governorate (now Krasnoyarsk Krai), Russia, on the morning of June 30, 1908. It is classified as an impact event, even though no impact crater has been found; the object is thought to have exploded at an altitude of  rather than having hit the surface of the Earth.

The Tunguska event is the largest impact event on Earth in recorded history, though much larger impacts have occurred in prehistoric times. An explosion of this magnitude would be capable of destroying a large metropolitan area. It has been mentioned numerous times in popular culture, and has also inspired real-world discussion of asteroid impact avoidance.

Description

On 30 June 1908 (N. S.) (cited in Russia as 17 June 1908, O. S., before the implementation of the Soviet calendar in 1918), at around 07:17 local time, Evenki natives and Russian settlers in the hills northwest of Lake Baikal observed a bluish light, nearly as bright as the Sun, moving across the sky and leaving a thin trail. Closer to the horizon, there was a flash producing a billowing cloud, followed by a pillar of fire that cast a red light on the landscape. The pillar split in two and faded, turning to black. About ten minutes later, there was a sound similar to artillery fire. Eyewitnesses closer to the explosion reported that the source of the sound moved from the east to the north of them. The sounds were accompanied by a shock wave that knocked people off their feet and broke windows hundreds of kilometres away.

The explosion registered at seismic stations across Eurasia, and air waves from the blast were detected in Germany, Denmark, Croatia, and the United Kingdom—and as far away as Batavia, Dutch East Indies, and Washington, D.C. It is estimated that, in some places, the resulting shock wave was equivalent to an earthquake measuring 5.0 on the Richter magnitude scale. Over the next few days, night skies in Asia and Europe were aglow. There are contemporaneous reports of brightly lit photographs being successfully taken at midnight (without the aid of flashbulbs) in Sweden and Scotland. It has been theorized that this sustained glowing effect was due to light passing through high-altitude ice particles that had formed at extremely low temperatures as a result of the explosion—a phenomenon that decades later was reproduced by Space Shuttles. In the United States, a Smithsonian Astrophysical Observatory program at the Mount Wilson Observatory in California observed a months-long decrease in atmospheric transparency consistent with an increase in suspended dust particles.

Selected eyewitness reports

Though the region of Siberia in which the explosion occurred was very sparsely populated in 1908, there are accounts of the event from eyewitnesses who were in the surrounding area at the time, and regional newspapers reported the event shortly after it occurred.

According to the testimony of S. Semenov, as recorded by Russian mineralogist Leonid Kulik's expedition in 1930:

Testimony of Chuchan of Shanyagir tribe, as recorded by I. M. Suslov in 1926:

Sibir newspaper, 2 July 1908:

Siberian Life newspaper, 27 July 1908:

Krasnoyaretz newspaper, 13 July 1908:

Scientific investigation
Since the 1908 event, there have been an estimated 1,000 scholarly papers (most in Russian) published about the Tunguska explosion. Owing to the remoteness of the site and the limited instrumentation available at the time of the event, modern scientific interpretations of its cause and magnitude have relied chiefly on damage assessments and geological studies conducted many years after the event.

It was not until more than a decade after the event that any scientific analysis of the region took place, in part due to the isolation of the area and significant political upheaval affecting Russia in the 1910s. In 1921, the Russian mineralogist Leonid Kulik led a team to the Podkamennaya Tunguska River basin to conduct a survey for the Soviet Academy of Sciences. Although they never visited the central blast area, the many local accounts of the event led Kulik to believe that the explosion had been caused by a giant meteorite impact. Upon returning, he persuaded the Soviet government to fund an expedition to the suspected impact zone, based on the prospect of salvaging meteoric iron.

Kulik led a scientific expedition to the Tunguska blast site in 1927. He hired local Evenki hunters to guide his team to the centre of the blast area, where they expected to find an impact crater. To their surprise, there was no crater to be found at ground zero. Trees more distant from the centre had been partly scorched and knocked down in a direction away from the centre, creating a large radial pattern of downed trees.

Upon closer examination, Kulik located holes that he erroneously concluded were meteorite holes; he did not have the means at that time to excavate the holes.

During the following 10 years, there were three more expeditions to the area. Kulik found several dozens of little "pothole" bogs, each  in diameter, that he thought might be meteoric craters. After a laborious exercise in draining one of these bogs (the so-called "Suslov's crater",  in diameter), he found an old tree stump on the bottom, ruling out the possibility that it was a meteoric crater. In 1938, Kulik arranged for an aerial photographic survey of the area covering the central part of the leveled forest. The original negatives of these aerial photographs (1,500 negatives, each ) were burned in 1975 by order of Yevgeny Krinov, then Chairman of the Committee on Meteorites of the USSR Academy of Sciences, as part of an initiative to dispose of flammable nitrate film. Positive prints were preserved for further study in the Russian city of Tomsk.

Expeditions sent to the area in the 1950s and 1960s found microscopic silicate and magnetite spheres in siftings of the soil. Similar spheres were predicted to exist in the felled trees, although they could not be detected by contemporary means. Later expeditions did identify such spheres in the resin of the trees. Chemical analysis showed that the spheres contained high proportions of nickel relative to iron, which is also found in meteorites, leading to the conclusion they were of extraterrestrial origin. The concentration of the spheres in different regions of the soil was also found to be consistent with the expected distribution of debris from a meteoroid air burst. Later studies of the spheres found unusual ratios of numerous other metals relative to the surrounding environment, which was taken as further evidence of their extraterrestrial origin.

Chemical analysis of peat bogs from the area also revealed numerous anomalies considered consistent with an impact event. The isotopic signatures of carbon, hydrogen, and nitrogen at the layer of the bogs corresponding to 1908 were found to be inconsistent with the isotopic ratios measured in the adjacent layers, and this abnormality was not found in bogs located outside the area. The region of the bogs showing these anomalous signatures also contains an unusually high proportion of iridium, similar to the iridium layer found in the Cretaceous–Paleogene boundary. These unusual proportions are believed to result from debris from the falling body that deposited in the bogs. The nitrogen is believed to have been deposited as acid rain, a suspected fallout from the explosion.

However other scientists disagree: "Some papers report that hydrogen, carbon and nitrogen isotopic compositions with signatures similar to those of CI and CM carbonaceous chondrites were found in Tunguska peat layers dating from the TE (Kolesnikov et al. 1999, 2003) and that iridium anomalies were also observed (Hou et al. 1998, 2004). Measurements performed in other laboratories have not confirmed these results (Rocchia et al. 1990; Tositti et al. 2006).".

Researcher John Anfinogenov has suggested that a boulder found at the event site, known as John's stone, is a remnant of the meteorite, but oxygen isotope analysis of the quartzite suggests that it is of hydrothermal origin, and probably related to Permian-Triassic Siberian Traps magmatism.

In 2013, a team of researchers published the results of an analysis of micro-samples from a peat bog near the centre of the affected area, which show fragments that may be of extraterrestrial origin.

Earth impactor model

Meteoroids enter Earth's atmosphere from outer space every day, travelling at a speed of at least . The heat generated by compression of air in front of the body (ram pressure) as it travels through the atmosphere is immense and most meteoroids burn up or explode before they reach the ground. More recent calculations that include the effect of the object's momentum find that more of the energy was focused downward than would be the case from a nuclear explosion and estimate that the air burst had an energy range from 3 to 5 megatons of TNT (13 to 21 PJ). The 15-megaton (Mt) estimate represents an energy about 1,000 times greater than that of Trinity, and roughly equal to that of the United States' Castle Bravo nuclear test in 1954 (which measured 15.2 Mt) and one-third that of the Soviet Union's Tsar Bomba test in 1961. A 2019 paper suggests the explosive power of the Tunguska event may have been around 20–30 megatons.

Since the second half of the 20th century, close monitoring of Earth's atmosphere through infrasound and satellite observation has shown that asteroid air bursts with energies comparable to those of nuclear weapons routinely occur, although Tunguska-sized events, on the order of 5–15 megatons, are much rarer. Eugene Shoemaker estimated that 20-kiloton events occur annually and that Tunguska-sized events occur about once every 300 years. More recent estimates place Tunguska-sized events at about once every thousand years, with 5-kiloton air bursts averaging about once per year. Most of these air bursts are thought to be caused by asteroid impactors, as opposed to mechanically weaker cometary materials, based on their typical penetration depths into the Earth's atmosphere. The largest asteroid air burst to be observed with modern instrumentation was the 500-kiloton Chelyabinsk meteor in 2013, which shattered windows and produced meteorites.

Glancing impact hypothesis 
In 2020, a group of Russian scientists  used a range of computer models to calculate the passage of asteroids with diameters of 200, 100, and 50 metres at oblique angles across Earth's atmosphere. They used a range of assumptions about the object's composition as if it was made of iron, rock or ice. The model which most closely matched the observed event was an iron asteroid up to 200 metres in diameter, travelling at 11.2 km per second which glanced off the Earth's atmosphere and returned into solar orbit.

Blast pattern
The explosion's effect on the trees near the hypocentre of the explosion was similar to the effects of the conventional Operation Blowdown. These effects are caused by the blast wave produced by large air-burst explosions. The trees directly below the explosion are stripped as the blast wave moves vertically downward, but remain standing upright, while trees farther away are knocked over because the blast wave is travelling closer to horizontal when it reaches them.

Soviet experiments performed in the mid-1960s, with model forests (made of matches on wire stakes) and small explosive charges slid downward on wires, produced butterfly-shaped blast patterns similar to the pattern found at the Tunguska site. The experiments suggested that the object had approached at an angle of roughly 30 degrees from the ground and 115 degrees from north and had exploded in mid-air.

Asteroid or comet
In 1930, the British meteorologist and mathematician F. J. W. Whipple suggested that the Tunguska body was a small comet. A comet is composed of dust and volatiles, such as water ice and frozen gases, and could have been completely vaporised by the impact with Earth's atmosphere, leaving no obvious traces. The comet hypothesis was further supported by the glowing skies (or "skyglows" or "bright nights") observed across Eurasia for several evenings after the impact, which are possibly explained by dust and ice that had been dispersed from the comet's tail across the upper atmosphere. The cometary hypothesis gained a general acceptance among Soviet Tunguska investigators by the 1960s.

In 1978, Slovak astronomer Ľubor Kresák suggested that the body was a fragment of Comet Encke. This is a periodic comet with an extremely short period of just over three years that stays entirely within the orbit of Jupiter. It is also responsible for the Beta Taurids, an annual meteor shower with a maximum activity around 28–29 June. The Tunguska event coincided with the peak activity of that shower, and the approximate trajectory of the Tunguska object is consistent with what would be expected from a fragment of Comet Encke. It is now known that bodies of this kind explode at frequent intervals tens to hundreds of kilometres above the ground. Military satellites have been observing these explosions for decades. During 2019 astronomers searched for hypothesized asteroids ~100 metres in diameter from the Taurid swarm between 5–11 July, and 21 July – 10 August. , there have been no reports of discoveries of any such objects.

In 1983, astronomer Zdeněk Sekanina published a paper criticising the comet hypothesis. He pointed out that a body composed of cometary material, travelling through the atmosphere along such a shallow trajectory, ought to have disintegrated, whereas the Tunguska body apparently remained intact into the lower atmosphere. Sekanina also argued that the evidence pointed to a dense rocky object, probably of asteroidal origin. This hypothesis was further boosted in 2001, when Farinella, Foschini, et al. released a study calculating the probabilities based on orbital modelling extracted from the atmospheric trajectories of the Tunguska object. They concluded with a probability of 83% that the object moved on an asteroidal path originating from the asteroid belt, rather than on a cometary one (probability of 17%). Proponents of the comet hypothesis have suggested that the object was an extinct comet with a stony mantle that allowed it to penetrate the atmosphere.

The chief difficulty in the asteroid hypothesis is that a stony object should have produced a large crater where it struck the ground, but no such crater has been found. It has been hypothesised that the passage of the asteroid through the atmosphere caused pressures and temperatures to build up to a point where the asteroid abruptly disintegrated in a huge explosion. The destruction would have to have been so complete that no remnants of substantial size survived, and the material scattered into the upper atmosphere during the explosion would have caused the skyglows. Typical carbonaceous chondrite substance tends to be dissolved with water rather quickly unless it is frozen.

Christopher Chyba and others have proposed a process whereby a stony meteorite could have exhibited the behaviour of the Tunguska impactor. Their models show that when the forces opposing a body's descent become greater than the cohesive force holding it together, it blows apart, releasing nearly all of its energy at once. The result is no crater, with damage distributed over a fairly wide radius, and all of the damage resulting from the thermal energy released in the blast.

Three-dimensional numerical modelling of the Tunguska impact done by Utyuzhnikov and Rudenko in 2008 supports the comet hypothesis. According to their results, the comet matter dispersed in the atmosphere, while the destruction of the forest was caused by the shock wave.

During the 1990s, Italian researchers, coordinated by the physicist Giuseppe Longo from the University of Bologna, extracted resin from the core of the trees in the area of impact to examine trapped particles that were present during the 1908 event. They found high levels of material commonly found in rocky asteroids and rarely found in comets.

Kelly et al. (2009) contend that the impact was caused by a comet because of the sightings of noctilucent clouds following the impact, a phenomenon caused by massive amounts of water vapour in the upper atmosphere. They compared the noctilucent cloud phenomenon to the exhaust plume from NASA's Endeavour Space Shuttle. The team suspected that 's orbit likely fits with the modelled orbit of the Tunguska object, even with the effects of weak non-gravitational forces. In 2013, analysis of fragments from the Tunguska site by a joint US-European team was consistent with an iron meteorite.

The February 2013 Chelyabinsk bolide event provided ample data for scientists to create new models for the Tunguska event. Researchers used data from both Tunguska and Chelyabinsk to perform a statistical study of over 50 million combinations of bolide and entry properties that could produce Tunguska-scale damage when breaking apart or exploding at similar altitudes. Some models focused on combinations of properties which created scenarios with similar effects to the tree-fall pattern as well as the atmospheric and seismic pressure waves of Tunguska. This is similar to the blast energy equivalent of the 1980 volcanic eruption of Mount St. Helens. The researchers also concluded impactors of this size hit the Earth only at an average interval scale of millennia.

Lake Cheko 

In June 2007, scientists from the University of Bologna identified a lake in the Tunguska region as a possible impact crater from the event. They do not dispute that the Tunguska body exploded in mid-air, but believe that a  fragment survived the explosion and struck the ground.

The hypothesis has been disputed by other impact crater specialists. A 1961 investigation had dismissed a modern origin of Lake Cheko, saying that the presence of metres-thick silt deposits at the lake's bed suggests an age of at least 5,000 years, but more recent research suggests that only a metre or so of the sediment layer on the lake bed is "normal lacustrine sedimentation", a depth consistent with an age of about 100 years. Acoustic-echo soundings of the lake floor provide support for the hypothesis that the lake was formed by the Tunguska event. The soundings revealed a conical shape for the lake bed, which is consistent with an impact crater. Magnetic readings indicate a possible metre-sized chunk of rock below the lake's deepest point that may be a fragment of the colliding body. Work is still being done at Lake Cheko to determine its origins.

The main points of the study are that:

In 2017, new research by Russian scientists pointed to a rejection of the theory that Lake Cheko was created by the Tunguska event. They used soil research to determine that the lake is 280 years old or even much older; in any case clearly older than the Tunguska event. In analyzing soils from the bottom of Lake Cheko, they identified a layer of radionuclide contamination from mid-20th century nuclear testing at Novaya Zemlya. The depth of this layer gave an average annual sedimentation rate of between 3.6 and 4.6 mm a year. These sedimentation values are less than half of the 1 cm/year calculated by Gasperini et al. in their 2009 publication on their analysis of the core they took from Lake Cheko in 1999. The Russian scientists in 2017, counted at least 280 such annual varves in the 1260 mm long core sample pulled from the bottom of the lake, representing an age of the lake that would be older than the Tunguska event.

Additionally, there are problems with impact physics: It is unlikely that a stony meteorite in the right size range would have the mechanical strength necessary to survive atmospheric passage intact, and yet still retain a velocity large enough to excavate a crater that size on reaching the ground.

Geophysical hypotheses
Though scientific consensus is that the Tunguska explosion was caused by the impact of a small asteroid, there are some dissenters. Astrophysicist Wolfgang Kundt has proposed that the Tunguska event was caused by the release and subsequent explosion of 10 million tons of natural gas from within the Earth's crust. The basic idea is that natural gas leaked out of the crust and then rose to its equal-density height in the atmosphere; from there, it drifted downwind, in a sort of wick, which eventually found an ignition source such as lightning. Once the gas was ignited, the fire streaked along the wick, and then down to the source of the leak in the ground, whereupon there was an explosion.

The similar verneshot hypothesis has also been proposed as a possible cause of the Tunguska event. Other research has proposed a geophysical mechanism for the event.

Similar event

A smaller air burst occurred over a populated area on 15 February 2013, at Chelyabinsk in the Ural district of Russia. It had an estimated initial mass of 11,000 tonnes and exploded with an energy release of approximately 500 kilotons. The air burst inflicted over 1,200 injuries, mainly from broken glass falling from windows shattered by its shock wave.

In popular culture

See also
 Asteroid Day, annual global event held on June 30
 Sikhote-Alin meteorite, 1947 impact
 Tunguska Nature Reserve, protected area covering a portion of the site; ongoing scientific study of forest recovery

References

Bibliography

 Baxter, John; Atkins, Thomas; introduction by Asimov, Isaac. The Fire Came By: The Riddle of the Great Siberian Explosion, (Garden City, New York (state)) Doubleday, 1976. . (New York) Warner Books, 1977. . (London) Macdonald and Jane's, 1975. .
 Bronshten, V. A. The Tunguska Meteorite: History of Investigations, (Moscow) A. D. Selyanov 2000 (in Russian). .
 Brown, John C.; Hughes, David. W. "Tunguska's comet and the non-thermal carbon-14 production in the atmosphere", Nature, Vol 268 (May) 1977 pp. 512–514.
 Chaikin, Andrew. "Target: Tunguska", Sky & Telescope, January 1984 pp. 18–21. The Kresak/Sekanina debate, in a very widely available journal. Cited in Verma.
 Christie, William H. "The great Siberian meteorite of 1908", The Griffith Observer, (Los Angeles) The Griffith Observatory, Vol 6 (April) 1942 pp. 38–47. This review is widely cited.
 Crowther, J. G. "More about the Great Siberian Meteorite", Scientific American, May 1931 pp. 314–317. Cited in Verma.
 
 Furneaux, Rupert. The Tungus Event: The Great Siberian Catastrophe of 1908, (New York) Nordon Publications, 1977. . (St. Albans) Panther, 1977. .
 Gallant, Roy A. The Day the Sky Split Apart: Investigating a Cosmic Mystery, (New York) Atheneum Books for Children, 1995. .
 Gallant, Roy A. "Journey to Tunguska", Sky & Telescope, June 1994 pp. 38–43. Cover article, with full-page map. Cited in Verma.
 Gasperini, Luca, Bonatti, Enrico and Longo, Giuseppe. The Tunguska Mystery 100 Years Later , Scientific American, June 2008.
 Krinov, E. L. Giant Meteorites, trans. J. S. Romankiewicz (Part III: The Tunguska Meteorite), (Oxford and New York) Pergamon Press, 1966.
 
 
  Cited in Baxter and Atkins, also in Verma.
 Ol'khovatov, A. Yu. "Geophysical Circumstances of the 1908 Tunguska Event in Siberia, Russia", Earth, Moon, and Planets, Vol 93 November 2003, pp. 163–173
 Perkins, Sid. "A Century Later, Scientists Still Study Tunguska", Science News, 21 June 2008 pp. 5–6. Includes 11 color photographs.
 Rubtsov, Vladimir. The Tunguska Mystery, (Dordrecht and New York) Springer, 2009. ; 2012, .
  This is one of several articles in a special issue, cover title: "Cosmic Cataclysms".
 Stoneley, Jack; with Lawton, A. T. Cauldron of Hell: Tunguska, (New York) Simon & Schuster, 1977. .
 Stoneley, Jack; with Lawton, A. T. Tunguska, Cauldron of Hell, (London) W. H. Allen, 1977. 
 Verma, Surendra. The Tunguska Fireball: Solving One of the Great Mysteries of the 20th century, (Cambridge) Icon Books Ltd., 2005. .
 Verma, Surendra. The Mystery of the Tunguska Fireball, (Cambridge) Icon Books Ltd., 2006. , also (Crows Nest, NSW, Australia) Allen & Unwin Pty Ltd., 2006, with same ISBN. Index has "Lake Cheko" as "Ceko, Lake", without "h".

External links

 Tunguska picturesMany Tunguska-related pictures with comments in English
 
 Preliminary results from the 1961 combined Tunguska meteorite expedition
 1908 Siberia Explosion. Reconstruction by William K. Hartmann.
 
 "Mystery space blast 'solved (BBC News)
 Sound of the Tunguska event (reconstruction)
 The Tunguska Event 100 Years laterNASA
 

1908 in the environment
1908 in the Russian Empire
1908 natural disasters
Explosions in 1908
Explosions in Russia
Fires in Russia
Geography of Krasnoyarsk Krai
History of Siberia
Holocene Asia
Holocene events
June 1908 events
Evenkiysky District
Yeniseysk Governorate
Modern Earth impact events
Natural disasters in Siberia
Unsolved problems in physics